The Financial District is a highrise office commercial area within the central business district of Vancouver, British Columbia, Canada. Located roughly along Burrard and West Georgia Streets on the Downtown Peninsula, the Financial District contains more than 60% of Greater Vancouver's office space, and is home to headquarters of forest products and mining companies. The area contains numerous federal and non-governmental organizations (NGO) offices, overseas missions and consulates, and headquarter and branch offices of national and international banks and financial services, accounting and law firms, and luxury hotels.

History
The city's financial district emerged in the early 1900s when the building boom in the area began. From 1907 to 1913 a number of office buildings were built in the area along West Hastings Street:

 Sun Tower
 Dominion Trust Building
 Vancouver Stock Exchange

The financial district only expanded after the 1970s, with much of the new buildings emerging after the 1980s.

Vancouver's financial district is compact area when compared to other world cities. Most of the skyscrapers in the district are regional offices of the Big Five Canadian-based or International banks and various financial services institutions.

Major skyscrapers and buildings

 Trump International Hotel and Tower (Vancouver)
 HSBC Canada Building
 Harbour Centre
 One Wall Centre
 Guinness Tower
 Burrard Building
 Royal Centre
 Park Place
 MNP Tower
 Canaccord Tower
 Scotia Tower
 Oceanic Plaza
 Living Shangri-La
 Cathedral Place
 Fairmont Hotel Vancouver
 Ritz-Carlton Vancouver
 FortisBC Centre
 745 Thurlow
 Western Forest Products
 1075 West Georgia Tower
 Four Seasons Hotel Vancouver
 Hyatt Regency Vancouver
 Pacific Centre
 Bentall Centre, Vancouver
 Sinclair Centre
 Sun Tower
 Electra Building
 TD Tower
 Fairmont Pacific Rim

Transit
Vancouver's Financial District is well served by numerous local and commuter bus routes running along Burrard and Georgia streets. In the heart of the Financial District lies Burrard Station, providing metro rail access to thousands of commuters daily via SkyTrain Expo Line. A short distance to the north is Waterfront Station which provides access to Seabus, West Coast Express commuter rail, and SkyTrain Canada Line.

See also
Downtown Vancouver
Economy of Vancouver

References

External links
Vancouver Economic Development Commission

Neighbourhoods in Vancouver
Financial districts in Canada
Economy of Vancouver